Pink Pills is the second studio album by Australian pop band The Mavis's. It was released in April 1998 by record label Mushroom.

Pink Pills was released in April 1998 by record label Mushroom. It reached number 12 on the Australian albums chart. At the ARIA Music Awards of 1998, Pink Pills received ARIA Award nominations for Best Pop Release and Best Cover Art.

Four singles were released from the album: "Naughty Boy", "Cry", "Lever" and "Puberty Song". At the 1999 ARIA Awards, "Puberty Song" earned Kalju Tonuma a nomination for Engineer of the Year.

Track listing

Weekly charts

References 

1998 albums
The Mavis's albums